Jutta Kirst (née Krautwurst; born 10 November 1954 in Dresden, Sachsen) is a retired female track and field athlete who competed for East Germany during her career in the women's high jump. She competed at the 1980 Summer Olympics held in Moscow, Russia  where she won the bronze medal in the women's high jump competition.

External links 
 
 

1954 births
Living people
East German female high jumpers
Olympic bronze medalists for East Germany
Athletes (track and field) at the 1980 Summer Olympics
Olympic athletes of East Germany
Athletes from Dresden
Medalists at the 1980 Summer Olympics
Olympic bronze medalists in athletics (track and field)
Universiade medalists in athletics (track and field)
Universiade silver medalists for East Germany
Medalists at the 1973 Summer Universiade